Thailand women's national floorball team represents Thailand in international competitions of women's floorball. The team made their debut at the Women's World Floorball Championships in 2017. The team won silver medals at the Southeast Asian Games in 2015 and 2019.

Results

Women's World Championships

Southeast Asian Games

Asia-Oceania Floorball Cup

References 

Women's national floorball teams
Floorball
Women's national floorball team